Dev Kant Barooah (22 February 1914 – 28 January 1996) was an Indian politician from Assam, who served as the President of the Indian National Congress during the Emergency (1975–77).

Early life
Baruah was born on 22 February 1914 to Nilkanta Baruah at Dibrugarh, Assam Province (present-day Assam). He studied at Nowgong Government High School and graduated from Banaras Hindu University. After joining the Indian freedom struggle, he was imprisoned in 1930, 1941 and 1942.

Career
In 1949–1951, Baruah's political career began as a member of the Constituent Assembly. He is now chiefly remembered for his alleged sycophancy to Prime Minister Indira Gandhi, encapsulated by his c. 1974 proclamation that "India is Indira. Indira is India." However, he later parted ways with her and joined Congress (Urs), later renamed as Indian Congress (Socialist). He was the Governor of Bihar from 1 February 1971 to 4 February 1973.  He died in New Delhi. He is the first and only Assamese to be elected as a president of Indian National Congress.

Baruah was a noted poet as well. His collection of Assamese poems, Sagar Dekhisa (সাগৰ দেখিছা), is still very popular. He was the elder brother of famous Assamese poet Nabakanta Barua.

References

External links 

|-

|-

1914 births
1996 deaths
20th-century Indian poets
India MPs 1952–1957
India MPs 1977–1979
Assamese-language poets
The Emergency (India)
Governors of Bihar
Indian Congress (Socialist) politicians
Indian National Congress (U) politicians
Lok Sabha members from Assam
Members of the Cabinet of India
People from Dibrugarh district
Presidents of the Indian National Congress
Speakers of the Assam Legislative Assembly
Petroleum and Natural Gas Ministers of India
Indian National Congress politicians from Assam